Philae Island was an island near the expansive First Cataract of the Nile in Upper Egypt. Due to the building of the Aswan Dam, the island is today submerged under Lake Nasser. Prior to the submerging, the Philae temple complex which had been built on the island, was moved to Agilkia Island.

References

Islands of the Nile
River islands of Egypt
Archaeological sites in Egypt
Philae